Hilborn may refer to:

 Ariana Hilborn (born 1980), US-born Latvian long-distance runner
 Neil Hilborn (born 1990), American slam poet
 Ray Hilborn (born 1947), marine biologist
Robert Hilborn Falls (1924–2009), CMM, CD (born April 24, 1924), Chief of Defence Staff of the Canadian Forces from 1977 to 1980
Samuel G. Hilborn (1834–1899), U.S. Representative from California.
Stuart Hilborn (1917–2013), hot-rodder who developed early fuel injection systems for race cars
 William Carrall Hilborn (1898–1918), World War I Canadian flying ace